U.S.A. (United State of Atlanta) (stylized on the cover as U.nited S.tate of A.tlanta) is the fourth studio album by Atlanta-based rap duo Ying Yang Twins. The album debuted at No. 2 on the Billboard 200, with approximately 201,000 copies sold in the first week released, marking the duo's highest-charting album to date. The album was eventually certified 3× platinum by the RIAA with an excess of 3 million copies sold . It was also released in a chopped and screwed version.

The Collipark remix of "(I Got That) Boom Boom" with Britney Spears was initially going to appear on the album but did not make the final cut.

Track listing
Credits adapted from the album's liner notes.

Sample Credits
 "Long Time" contains an interpolation of "Belle", written by Reuben Fairfax, Al Green, and Fred Jordan.
 "Ghetto Classics" contains a sample of "Beat Box", written by Anne Dudley, Trevor Horn, J. J. Jeczalik, Gary Langan, and Paul Morley, and performed by Art of Noise.
 "Bedroom Boom" contains an interpolation of "I Will Always Be There For You", written by Michael Sterling.
 "Hoes" contains an interpolation of "I Hate Hoes", written by Jeffrey Thompkins.
 "Put That Thang Down" contains a sample of "When I Hear Music", written by Tony Butler, and performed by Debbie Deb.
 "Shake" contains a sample of "Din Daa Daa", written and performed by George Kranz.

Charts

Weekly charts

Year-end charts

References

2005 albums
Ying Yang Twins albums
TVT Records albums
Albums produced by Mr. Collipark